The Boy Who Loved Trolls is a 1984 American made-for-television fantasy-adventure film produced for the PBS series WonderWorks.

The story was adapted by James A. DeVinney from a play by John Wheatcroft. The original play, entitled Ofoeti, was telecast in 1966, on NET Playhouse, winning a National Television Award that year for best original television play.

Plot
12-year-old Paul would like nothing more than for the magical trolls and mermaids he reads about in his favorite story to be real. He goes searching for a real troll and finally meets one named Ofoeti, who has friends like Kalotte, a mermaid, and Socrates, a talking turtle. Soon the mermaid's home is threatened by an evil bridge builder. Paul also discovers that Ofoeti is dying and has less than a day to live. Paul must see if he has what it takes to risk everything and save his new friends.

Cast

References

External links

 

1984 television films
1984 films
1980s fantasy adventure films
American fantasy adventure films
1980s children's adventure films
1980s children's fantasy films
Films about trolls
American films based on plays
1980s English-language films
1980s American films